Francisco 'Fran' Escribá Segura (born 3 May 1965) is a Spanish football manager and former player who played as a left winger. He is the current manager of Real Zaragoza.

Club career
Born in Valencia, Escribá played youth football with Valencia CF, but never competed in higher than Segunda División B as a senior; he represented CD Mestalla, CF Nules, FC Andorra, Catarroja CF, Torrent CF, CD Eldense, Novelda CF, CD Villena and Pinoso CF. In 2002, after a year in charge of CD Buñol, he returned to Valencia, taking care of the youth sides.

In 2004, Escribá started an association with Quique Sánchez Flores that would last several seasons, always as assistant. He started with Getafe CF, subsequently moving to S.L. Benfica and Atlético Madrid; the pair went their separate ways at the end of 2010–11, because the former wanted to have a go at head coaching. 

Escribá was appointed at Segunda División club Elche CF on 12 June 2012. In his first year he led the Valencians to La Liga after an absence of 24 years and, on 28 May 2013, renewed his contract for two more seasons.

On 26 June 2015, following Elche's administrative relegation, Escribá was named Getafe CF manager. On 11 April of the following year, with the team seriously threatened with relegation, he was sacked.

On 11 August 2016, Escribá replaced Marcelino García Toral at the helm of Villarreal CF. He led the side to the fifth position in his first season, with the subsequent qualification to the UEFA Europa League.

On 25 September 2017, in spite of many injuries to the squad, and following a 4–0 away loss against former club Getafe, Escribá was fired. He returned to work on 3 March 2019, becoming RC Celta de Vigo's third coach of the campaign after Miguel Cardoso's dismissal. 

Escribá was relieved of his duties on 3 November 2019, with the team sitting in the relegation zone. He returned to Elche in February 2021, avoiding relegation in the last matchday at the expense of SD Huesca after a 2–0 home win over Athletic Bilbao.

On 21 November 2021, following a 0–3 home loss to Real Betis which saw the side move into the relegation zone, Escribá was dismissed. Eleven months later, he took over Real Zaragoza in the second division.

Managerial statistics

Honours
Elche
Segunda División: 2012–13

Individual
Miguel Muñoz Trophy (Segunda División): 2012–13

References

External links

 

1965 births
Living people
Spanish footballers
Footballers from Valencia (city)
Association football wingers
Segunda División B players
Tercera División players
Valencia CF Mestalla footballers
FC Andorra players
CD Eldense footballers
Novelda CF players
Spanish football managers
La Liga managers
Segunda División managers
Elche CF managers
Getafe CF managers
Villarreal CF managers
RC Celta de Vigo managers
Real Zaragoza managers
S.L. Benfica non-playing staff
Spanish expatriate sportspeople in Portugal